Karbow-Vietlübbe is a former municipality in the Ludwigslust-Parchim district, in Mecklenburg-Vorpommern, Germany. Since 1 January 2014, it is part of the municipality Gehlsbach.

References

Former municipalities in Mecklenburg-Western Pomerania